The Players Tour Championship 2011/2012 – Event 6 (also known as the  2011 Warsaw Classic) was a professional minor-ranking snooker tournament that took place between 29 September – 2 October 2011 at the Arena Ursynów in Warsaw, Poland. This was the first professional snooker tournament held in Poland.

Neil Robertson won his eighth professional title by defeating Ricky Walden 4–1 in the final.

Prize fund and ranking points
The breakdown of prize money and ranking points of the event is shown below:

1 Only professional players can earn ranking points.

Main draw

Preliminary rounds

Round 1
Best of 7 frames

Round 2
Best of 7 frames

Main rounds

Top half

Section 1

Section 2

Section 3

Section 4

Bottom half

Section 5

Section 6

Section 7

Section 8

Finals

Century breaks 
 

 143  Alfie Burden
 141, 115, 110  Xiao Guodong
 137  Tom Ford
 135, 113, 105  Judd Trump
 134  Jamie Jones
 131, 103  Ricky Walden
 128  Stuart Bingham
 128  Fergal O'Brien
 125  David Gilbert
 124  Marco Fu
 123  Michael Holt
 114, 113, 103  Neil Robertson

 114  Graeme Dott
 112  Michael Wasley
 109  Aditya Mehta
 107  Dominic Dale
 107  Chen Zhe
 106  Shaun Murphy
 104  Rory McLeod
 103  Mark Joyce
 100  Mark Davis
 100  Paul Davison
 100  Kacper Filipiak
 100  Joe Perry

References

External links 

06
2011 in Polish sport
October 2011 sports events in Europe